RespectAbility is an American nonpartisan nonprofit organization dedicated to empowerment and self-advocacy for individuals with disabilities. Its official mission is to fight stigmas and advance opportunities for people with disabilities. RespectAbility was founded by one-time political consultant Jennifer Laszlo Mizrahi and philanthropists Donn Weinberg (its founding chairperson, from The Harry and Jeanette Weinberg Foundation) and Shelly Cohen in 2013. Its current President and CEO is Ariel Simms, and its chairperson is Ollie Cantos.

Education and employment for persons with disabilities 
RespectAbility is working to expand education and employment opportunities for people with disabilities. RespectAbility has worked with governors across the country to help advance and realign state programs to help people with disabilities obtain competitive, integrated employment opportunities. RespectAbility has provided testimony on disability employment in all 50 states and at the federal level.

Disabled persons in media and movies 
RespectAbility is working to change the narrative in Hollywood to ensure accurate and positive media portrayals of people with disabilities. RespectAbility is working with several partners within the entertainment industry on the full inclusion of people with disabilities, both in front and behind the camera.

Born This Way, which won an Emmy for best Outstanding Unstructured Reality Program in 2017, stars seven diverse young adults with Down syndrome as they deal with issues around employment, independent living, education and romance. The show was created by former RespectAbility board member Jonathan Murray. It was launched at an event on Capitol Hill hosted by RespectAbility along with Congressman Brad Sherman and Congresswoman Cathy McMorris Rodgers. Murray was recognized for this and other inclusion work by Variety.

National Leadership Program 
The National Leadership Program is an Apprenticeship program which enables individuals with and without disabilities to gain experience in policy, development, fundraising, publicity and general political discourse surrounding individuals with disabilities and their integration into the community.

Political outreach and advocacy 
RespectAbility is the parent organization for www.TheRespectAbilityReport.org, which covers the intersection of politics and public policy. It covered all the presidential candidates in the 2016 and 2020 presidential campaigns. Their political advocacy was featured in a segment on the PBS NewsHour, The Diane Rehm Show, page 1 of The New York Times, and page 1 of The Washington Post and NPR, HME News, The Atlantic and other publications.

Controversy

The organization has come under fire due to its Founder Jennifer Laszlo Mizrahi's comments about race and the 2016 election. Although Mizrahi was making a highly technical (and probably incorrect) point about what might turn the election in favor of Hillary Clinton, multiple disability rights bloggers objected to Mizrahi's comments. After Mizrahi's September 21, 2016, comments on her personal Facebook page, the organization stated Mizrahi did not speak for the organization on matters of that type in her personal blog. However, the following day, Mizrahi spoke on behalf of RespectAbility USA when she was quoted on CNN about white disabled voters. In response, RespectAbility issued an apology, which many disabled bloggers felt was a non-apology since she never actually apologized. Later the organization issued a more detailed apology amidst pressure from the disability community.

The Harriet Tubman Collective, have called out RespectAbility and Mizrahi on their social media platforms, for her racism, and appropriation of the work of their members, who are disabled black women.

References

External links 

Disability organizations based in the United States
Disability rights organizations
Disability rights